Guarini is a surname. Notable people with the surname include:

 Giovanni Battista Guarini (1538–1612), Italian poet and diplomat
 Anna Guarini, Contessa Trotti, (1563–1598), Italian virtuoso singer of the late Renaissance
 Frank Joseph Guarini (born 1924), American politician
 Guarino Guarini (1624–1683), Italian architect and Theatine priest
 Justin Guarini (born 1978), American singer who rose to fame on the television show American Idol

See also
 Guarani (disambiguation)